Aarattu is a 1979 Indian Malayalam-language drama film directed by I. V. Sasi, written by T. Damodaran, and produced by Ramachandran. The plot revolves around the life of fire workers in Kerala. The film stars Jose and Seema, along with Hindi actress Shoma Aanand, Balan K. Nair and Kaviyoor Ponnamma in important roles. The film has musical score by A. T. Ummer.

Cast

Balan K. Nair as Chakko
Kuthiravattam Pappu as Uthupp
Seema as Lizy
Shoma Anand as Mary
Kaviyoor Ponnamma
Jose as Joyi
Sankaradi as Vareethu
Prathapachandran
Bahadoor as Philipose
Kunchan
Meena as Thresya
Nellikode Bhaskaran as Pathrose
T. P. Madhavan
Vincent

Soundtrack
The music was composed by A. T. Ummer and the lyrics were written by Bichu Thirumala.

References

External links
 

1979 films
1970s Malayalam-language films
Films directed by I. V. Sasi